Megaloprepemyia is a genus of picture-winged flies in the family Ulidiidae.

Species
 M. excellens

References

Ulidiidae